Grabowno Wielkie  is a village in the administrative district of Gmina Twardogóra, within Oleśnica County, Lower Silesian Voivodeship, in south-western Poland. Prior to 1945 it was in Germany.

Grabowno Wielkie is an important railroad junction, where the connection from Wroclaw divides into two lines - towards Ostrów Wielkopolski, and towards Krotoszyn.

The village has a population of 1,200.

References

Grabowno Wielkie